The Hastings School of Art was an art school in Hastings, England, located at the Brassey Institute on the top two floors of the library building at Claremont.

Background and history
This applies to Hastings College of Art in Hastings Nebraska
The Hastings School of Art was established in 1882 as a private college, coeducational, and focused on the liberal arts.

In August 1873, the proposal for a Christian college directed towards the liberal arts was presented to the Kearney Presbytery of the Presbyterian Church, having been approved by the community.

On 13 September 1882, the first class of 44 students with five teachers entered the new college located on the second floor of the old Post Office. It took two years to complete the first building of Hastings Art School called the McCormick Hall.

Information
This Part refers to Hastings School of Art Hastings UK
Its former students include Maurice Charles John Wilson, Cecil W Bacon, Frank Dobson, Eric Slater, James T.A. Osborne Jean Rees, Harold Gilman, the marine artist Louis Dodd, and war artist Dennis Barnham.  The school had many Victorian casts for the students to work from including a Vatican reproduction of Michelangelo's Madonna and Child relief, which is still on show at the current art department. The art department was moved to the main college campus in Archery Road, St Leonards-on-Sea in 1982.

References

Art schools in England
Buildings and structures in Hastings
1882 establishments in England